Notting Hill Gate is a London Underground station near Notting Hill, London, located on the street called Notting Hill Gate. On the Central line, it is between Holland Park to the west and Queensway to the east. On the District line and Circle line, it is between High Street Kensington and Bayswater stations. It is on the boundary of Travelcard Zone 1 and Zone 2.

History
The sub-surface Circle and District line platforms were opened on 1 October 1868 by the Metropolitan Railway (MR) as part of its extension from Paddington to Gloucester Road. The Central line platforms were opened on 30 July 1900 by the Central London Railway (CLR). Entrances to the two sets of platforms were originally via separate station buildings on opposite sides of the road; access to the CLR platforms was originally via lifts.

The station name Notting Hill Gate had potential for confusion with the MR station to the north in Ladbroke Grove which was known as "Notting Hill" when opened in 1864, and renamed "Notting Hill & Ladbroke Grove" in 1880.  This latter station eventually, in 1919, dropped its reference to Notting Hill, becoming "Ladbroke Grove (North Kensington)" in 1919 and, simply, "Ladbroke Grove" in 1938 (see Ladbroke Grove Underground station).

On the Circle and District lines Notting Hill Gate is a cut and cover station still covered with a glass roof, despite many other similar stations having lost theirs.

Redevelopment 
The station was rebuilt in the late 1950s and reopened on 1 March 1959, now linking the two 'Notting Hill Gate stations' on the Circle and District and Central lines, which had previously been accessed on either side of the street, with a shared sub-surface ticket hall and escalators down to the deeper Central line, replacing the aged and now sealed-off lifts. The escalators were the first on the Underground to have metal side panels rather than wooden. The new entrance also acts as a pedestrian subway under the widened Notting Hill Gate. The mosaic columns at the southern entrance were created in 2006 by local public art organisation Urban Eye.

Refurbishment

The station was refurbished from 2010 to 2011, with new ceramic tiling throughout the subway entrances, deep-level passageways and Central line tube platforms as well as a modified ticket hall layout.

During the refurbishment works an abandoned lift passageway from the original 1900 CLR station, closed to the public after Notting Hill Gate was last upgraded in 1959, was rediscovered and found to contain a series of original posters dating from the late 1950s. Images have been posted online.

A scheme was developed by the architects Weston Williamson to provide canopies over the entrances from the street, but this has not been implemented.

Nearby places
 Portobello Road, famous for Portobello Market
 Kensington Palace Gardens

Media appearances
In the 1968 film Otley, one of the Central line platforms at Notting Hill Gate (or a station pretending to be it) is where the assassin and coach driver Johnston, played by Leonard Rossiter, blows himself up opening a booby-trapped suitcase full of money.

The station and its staff featured prominently in the third episode of BBC Two documentary series The Tube, which first aired on 5 March 2012.

Layout
The westbound Central line platform is located above the eastbound platform because when the CLR was built it did not want to tunnel under buildings, and the street above was not wide enough for the two platforms to be side by side.

Connections
London Buses routes 27, 28, 31, 52, 70, 94, 148, 328 and 452 and night routes N28, N31 and N207 serve the station
Oxford Tube coaches.

Gallery

References

External links
 London Transport Museum Photographic Archive
 
 
 
 
 
 

Circle line (London Underground) stations
District line stations
Central line (London Underground) stations
London Underground Night Tube stations
Tube stations in the Royal Borough of Kensington and Chelsea
Former Metropolitan Railway stations
Railway stations in Great Britain opened in 1868
Former Central London Railway stations
Railway stations in Great Britain opened in 1900
Buildings and structures in Notting Hill